Cowboy Bob may refer to:

 Bob Bradley (wrestler) (also "Cowboy" Bob Bradley), retired American professional wrestler
 Bob Kelly (wrestler) (also "Cowboy" Bob Kelly; 1936–2014), American professional wrestler and booker
 Robert H. Macy (also "Cowboy Bob"; 1930–2011), Democratic District Attorney
 Bob Orton Jr. (also "Cowboy" Bob Orton; born 1950), American retired professional wrestler
 Cowboy Bob, a fictional character from the daily syndicated newspaper comic strip Dennis the Menace
 Peggy Jo Tallas, who was wanted by the FBI under this name when she robbed banks in disguise